Jay Wallace may refer to:
Jay Wallace (journalist), president of FOX News
R. Jay Wallace (born 1957), professor of philosophy at the University of California
James Wallace (English footballer) (born 1991), English footballer